Citroën Argentina S.A. was the Argentine subsidiary of French automotive manufacturer Citroën which produced vehicles of the brand in the country. Established in 1959 and headquartered in Barracas, Buenos Aires, it operated in the country for 30 years producing vehicles until the economic crisis during the military government forced the company to cease its operations.

The Citroën brand would return to Argentina as part of the local PSA Group subsidiary that took over Peugeot and Citroën operations after acquiring rights to the Peugeot brand from defunct company Sevel Argentina.

In 2021, PSA Group Argentina became part of Stellantis Argentina.

History

Background: Imported models 
From the beginning of the 20th century to the end of the 50's the automotive market in Argentina was dominated almost exclusively by cars of North American origin, while European cars were relegated to somewhat more eccentric drivers.

The first models of the French firm arrived in Argentina at the beginning of the 20's, some Type A 10HP and Type B2 were imported individually or by request, but very rarely. Only in 1925 the firm Vengerow y Cía. In charge of its founder Marcos Vengerow and his sons León and Jack, the business got representation of Citroën (and Voisin) for Argentina. This firm, which had its showroom at 1165 Montevideo Street, began by importing the 5CV, commonly known as Treflé (clover leaf) due to the particular arrangement of its three seats. This model became very famous in those years in Argentina due to the fact that several Argentine movie stars drove Treflé models, some of them were Sofía Bozan, Iris Marga, Pepe Arias, Florencio Parravicini were just some of the artists that helped the 5CV being recognisable to public. Other body versions of the 5CV could also be purchased, such as the 2-seater Torpedo and the 2-seater Cabriolet with the particular "boat tail".

Then, in 1926, the Vengerow firm expanded the range with the B12 (20 HP) and B14 (22 HP) models in 15 different body versions. In 1929 the company changed its name to "Gesta Vengerow y Cía.", presenting in the Hall of Buenos Aires the brand new models C4 and C6. Due to the fact that in those years Argentina drove on the left, the versions imported by the Vengerow firm were those manufactured for England.

In 1931, Citroën's representation in Argentina passed to the company "Talleres Metalúrgicos San Martín" with its headquarters at Calle Florida 983 and an exclusive service station for customers on Avenida Alvear in Buenos Aires. This firm continued with the importation of C4F (30 HP) and C6F (45 HP) models but not for long. It was not until 1939 when Citroën set commercial offices at 464 Paseo Colón street and presented the 7CV (in its latest version: 7C) 11CV models, in the B, BL, Familiale and Cabriolet versions and a very few 15 SIX G and Type R23 trucks.

During the Second World War, the importation of vehicles from France ceased, to be restarted in 1946 with an official dealership, Teodoro Gilotaux, located at 3628 Alvear Avenue and its own workshop at 3626 Canning Street. This dealership brought the Traction Avant model, also known as "11 Ligero" (light eleven). The car quickly earned a solid reputation, being advertised as "the ideal car for the plain and the mountains". sold very well in Argentina. It also included in its catalog the 11 Normale, Cabriolet and Familiale, as well as the King of the road: the 15 SIX D. Racers Rodolfo Brusco and Jorge Ansaldo travelled from Buenos Aires to New York in 1951 on a 1947 Traction Avant. In 1953, some races exclusively for Traction Avant cars were held in Autódromo de Buenos Aires

In 1947, the commercial subsidiary of Citroën was founded in Buenos Aires under the name of SIVARA, which imported the chassis of the Type 45 6-cylinder heavy trucks, and in 1951 Automobiles Citroën S.R.L appeared. with its offices and sales room at 1117 Venezuela Street in the Federal Capital.

The reason why the 2CV did not appear before in Argentina was due to the fact that there were, until the end of 1955, tax regimes that applied to all cars whose weight was less than one ton, which was a serious obstacle for the importation of vehicles. Towards the end of the 1950s, the first DS and ID appeared, they were quickly nicknamed Citroën Sapo (frog), but it was not well received due to its unusual design at the time and its high price.

Local production 

1958 is the year in which the Citroën 2CV made its official appearance thanks to another dealership that imported them: Staudt y Cía. S.A. These models from France and Belgium caused great astonishment and, as in European countries, their followers began to grow since they perfectly adapted to our varied geography; pampas and mountains, hot or cold, dirt or asphalt did not seem to matter to the 2CV and sales grew day by day, in this context the Citroën plant in France decided to grant the concession for the manufacture of these vehicles in Argentina. Therefore, Decree 12,267/59 authorized the filing of capital for the assembly of 2CV in Argentina while Resolution 90/59 of the Ministry of Industry and Mining approved the manufacturing plans for category B-segment automobiles presented by the Societe Anonyme André Citroën of Paris.

Thus, on March 25, 1959, "Citroën Argentina Sociedad Anónima" was founded by decree number 3,693/59 granted by the Executive Power of the Nation and legal status was granted on May 8 of this year. The assembly of 2CV AZL vehicles began on February 18, 1960, in a provisional plant located in the town of Jeppener in Brandsen Partido, 80 kilometers from the Federal Capital. This plant was a sewing machine factory, "Pfaff Bromberg S.A.I.C.", which had very advanced machining centers for the time. Because of that and through an agreement with the directors of this company, about 100 cars and 20 AZU vans were assembled there. The plant continued to work for Citroën Argentina S.A. until 1980 under the name of EMECA and then belonged to PSA Peugeot-Citroën of Argentina.

Meanwhile, the final plant was being built in the old Catita kitchen factory, on a 75,000 m2 site located at 3220 Zepita street, in the industrial neighborhood of Barracas, Buenos Aires. It was inaugurated on May 31, 1960, when the 2CV number 101 left the assembly line. In this same year Citroën presented a booth exhibition at the International Motor Show in Buenos Aires in which it built a test track in which all kind of roads and streets of the country were reproduced. The 2CVs were driven by test pilots took visitors for a ride around this track where they did all kinds of demonstrations to the surprise of the passengers and the public. One DS19, two ID19 and three ID breaks were exhibited there. After the show ended it went up for auction, the offers were so many that they were sold for a price three times higher than the base price.

Initially, the plant had a covered area of 51,000 m2, distributed in two buildings, Edificio Norte and Edificio Sur with nearly 1,200 employees. On July 22, 1960, panel vans began to be assembled. The North building, with 23,000 covered m2, centralized the mechanical manufacturing and assembly of parts while the South Building of 28,000 m2 focused on the manufacture of bodywork, protection and painting and the final assembly of the vehicles. A third building, East Plant, stored all the autoparts to supply the dealership network, commercial, advertising, selling, after sales, guarantees areas and even mechanics academies. Citroen Argentina exported autoparts to France, Spain, Chile, Uruguay, and fully assembled vehicles to Paraguay, Bolivia, and Cuba.

In the beginning the vehicles were assembled with parts received from France, as the factory was assembled new manufacturing processes were incorporated and the parts and assemblies were nationalized. The production of vehicles increased constantly, from 992 units built in 1960 to 6,954 in 1964 to reach 15,280 units per year in 1969. By 1966 Citroën Argentina already had 30,000 units circulating on the streets.

3CV 

El 1º de noviembre de 1969 Citroën Argentina lanza el modelo 3CV AZAM-M28 con el motor de 602 cc. y 32 HP. a 6.250 R.P.M (motor M28), con alternador de 12 volts, primero con filtro de aceite en el interior del cárter (primer montaje) para luego, en 1971, incorporar el filtro del lubricante reemplazable en el exterior del cárter (segundo montaje). En el aspecto exterior las únicas diferencias con el 2CV eran: los faros traseros, que son los del Dyane 6 francés y en los faritos indicadores de giro delanteros de forma rectangular, combinando el diseño con los traseros, ubicados en el frente de los guardabarros (desaparecen los faros indicadores laterales). En su interior no hay mayores diferencias con el 2CV AZAM salvo en el velocímetro que ahora indica 120 km/h! La caja de velocidades es de diseño totalmente nuevo, propio de Citroën Argentina basada en la caja del ami 6 francés, (continua como opcional el embrague centrífugo), los tambores de frenos delanteros pasan a ser de 220 mm. de diámetro y las transmisiones son, en el 3CV, homocinéticas (con ocho crucetas) También se incorporan amortiguadores hidráulicos en las 4 ruedas. En 1970 tanto los 2CV como los 3CV incorporan las puertas delanteras de apertura «normal» según las normas de seguridad vigentes en ese año. Aparece la furgoneta AK, con la mecánica del 3CV, en versiones AKR (con vidrio lateral) y AK (sin vidrio lateral).

Ami 8 Club 
At the end of 1970, Citroën Argentina incorporated a completely new model into its production, the Ami 8 Club, with identical mechanics to the 3CV (second assembly) except for the carburetor, which was double body (Solex 26-35 CSIC) that powered to 35 HP. The press described Ami 8 as a "transition car", however it was not like that since it competed directly with models from the medium/small range such as the Renault 6 or the Fiat 128. Citroën de Argentina only manufactured the break (station wagon) version of the Ami 8, the Club, which unlike its French pair had front drum brakes. In the frame or chassis it incorporates a stabilizer bar (anti-roll) in the front, suspension cylinders and springs with a larger diameter than in the 2CV and 3CV, the inertia beaters continued and the wheel bearings were more large (from 35x72x27mm. to 36x76x29mm.) These features would be incorporated into the 3CV in 1971 with the exception of the stabilizer bar. The Ami 8 had a top speed of 113 km/h.

Mehari 

Also in 1971 Citroën Argentina launched a new model, the Méhari, an off-road roadster oriented to the young public also thought for rural and coastal areas, due to be built in polyester reinforced with fiberglass, unlike the European model made in ABS. Fiberglass was chosen because there were no machines in South America to mold plastics in that size. This bodywork was manufactured in Uruguay by the Dasur company.

The mechanics were exactly the same as the 3CV and red was its only color (although a series in blue was manufactured for the Tucumán police). The Méhari had a load capacity of 400 kg.

Closure 
Despite the increase in production compared to the previous year and plans to produce the GS model in Argentina, the company decided to finish its business in the country due to the government's economic policies.

In their Annual Report published in 1980, Citroen Argentina stated that 

On December 31, 1979, Citroën Argentina S.A. ceased activities, with a total of 223,442 vehicles produced.

Revival 

Two year after of the departure of Citroën from Argentina, engineer Eduardo Sal-Lari bought the market share of the subsidiary. During some time Sal-lari kept the license of the brand through the import of vehicles from France. In 1982 Sal-lari acquired parts to produce locally the 3CV engine and gearbox. In January 1983 Sal-Lari was authorised to produce automobiles in the country. A factory was built in Gowland, Mercedes Partido and the first cars were launched in November. Motor car builder Oreste Berta (who had supervised the IKA Torino car that competed in the 1969 Nürburgring 84-hour race) helped Sal-Lari in his project, improving the 3CV engine expanding it from 625cm3 to 850cm3 and from 28 to 45HP. It was also switched from air cooling to water cooling.

Therefore "Industrias Eduardo Sal-Lari" (IES) revived the 3CV models rebadged as IES 3CV. At a price of AR$388 million, the IES 3CV was the chepest car in Argentina. Models were produced in the old factory in Barracas while the Gowland plant was under construction. Sal-lari also rebadged other Citroën models such as the Méhari (renamed "Safari") and the 3CV panel van ("Carga"). Nevertheless, and due to lack of support from the national government, Sal-Lari was removed from the company in 1989 and IES was closed in 1990.

Vehicles produced 

Notes

References 
 

a
Motor vehicle manufacturers of Argentina
1954 establishments in Argentina
c
Argentine subsidiaries of foreign companies